This is a list of famous manuscripts.

Historical
 Carte Manuscripts
 Codex Nuttall 16th century, Mixtec
 Red Book of Hergest 14th about  century, Welsh
 Voynich manuscript unknown language
 Rohonc Codex mostly known as an unknown or 19th-century attempt to forge Hungarian (Székely) Runes

Literary

 Acallam na Senórach
 Banshenchas
 Leabhar Cloinne Aodha Buidhe
 Tochmarc Emire
 Yellow Book of Lecan

Religious

 Akilattirattu Ammanai, 19th century
 Alexandrian text-type, 3rd century
 Arul Nool, 19th century
 Book of Armagh, 9th century
 Book of Kells, 9th century
 Book of Lismore
 Cathach of St. Columba
 Codex Amiatinus, Vulgate, c. 700
 Codex Argenteus, Gothic Bible, 6th century
 Codex Gigas, the largest manuscript of the World, 13th century
 Codex Sinaiticus, 4th century
 Codex Vaticanus Graecus 1209, 4th century
 Codex Bezae, 5th century
 Codex Washingtonianus, 4th or 5th century
 Dead Sea scrolls
 Freising manuscripts, 10th century
 The Garland of Howth, late 9th to early 10th centuries
 Gospels of Tsar Ivan Alexander, 1355–56
 Lindisfarne Gospels, late 7th or early 8th century
 Nag Hammadi library
 Très Riches Heures du Duc de Berry early 15th century
 Uthman Qur'an, 8th century 
 Utrecht Psalter, 9th century
 The Coffin Texts, 19th century BC

Scientific
 Codex Leicester, 15th century
 Papyrus Graecus Holmiensis, a.k.a. Stockholm Papyrus describes some chemical processes in use in Egypt c. 1st century AD

Other
 Vergilius Augusteus, Vergilius Romanus and Vergilius Vaticanus, 4th and 5th centuries
 The Great Book of Ireland, 20th century
 Book of Leinster
 Collectio canonum Hibernensis
 Trinity College, Dublin Ms 1317

See also 
 Illuminated manuscript
 List of Hiberno-Saxon illuminated manuscripts
 List of illuminated manuscripts
 List of Irish manuscripts
 List of New Testament papyri
 List of New Testament uncials
 List of New Testament Latin manuscripts
 Manuscript culture
 List of codices
 Book of Job in illuminated manuscripts

External links
 Libraries Australia - catalog of manuscripts in 800+ Australian libraries
 Register of Australian Archives and Manuscripts

Manuscripts
Textual scholarship